The Guyana Trades Union Congress is a national trade union center in Guyana. It was founded in 1941 as the British Guiana Trades Union Council. It is affiliated with the International Trade Union Confederation.

See also

 List of trade unions
 List of federations of trade unions

References

International Trade Union Confederation
National trade union centres of Guyana
Trade unions established in 1941
British Guiana in World War II